La Rothière is a commune in the Aube department in north-central France.

Population

See also
Communes of the Aube department
Parc naturel régional de la Forêt d'Orient
Battle of La Rothière, 1814

References

Communes of Aube
Aube communes articles needing translation from French Wikipedia